2016 Pro Kabaddi League season was the third season of Pro Kabaddi League, a professional kabaddi league played in India since 2014. Pro Kabaddi, which saw astounding success in its second season, was all set to make its much awaited return for a third season from 30 January 2016, just five months after completion of the second season. Hyderabad hosted the opening leg of Season 3, with the first match being played between Telugu Titans and U Mumba at the Titan's home turf, Gachibowli Indoor Stadium.The winner is Patna Pirates.

Star Sports Pro Kabaddi, organized by Mashal Sports and Star India, in association with the International Kabaddi Federation, Asian Kabaddi Federation and the Amateur Kabaddi Federation of India is now going to be a bi-annual league with two seasons every year, promising much more action for the audiences and also encouraging them to take up to playing Kabaddi.

The third season of the league will feature 60 games played on specially developed mats, in state of the art indoor stadiums across 34 days in 8 cities. Following the same ‘caravan style’ format like in the first two seasons, the league will be played at each franchise city for a duration of 4 days, where the home team will play 4 of the visiting franchises. All seven visiting franchises will play a set of away games in each city.

After the opening leg in Hyderabad, the caravan will move to the Kanteerava Indoor Stadium, Bengaluru, followed by Netaji Indoor Stadium in Kolkata. This season, the badminton arena in the Balewadi Sports Complex, Pune will be the venue for the culmination to the first half of the league. The indoor stadium at the Patliputra Sports Complex, Patna will play host to the second half of the league with the caravan then moving to Sawai Mansingh Stadium in Jaipur on 20 February 2016. Moving on from Jaipur, the league will be played in at the Thyagaraj Indoor Stadium in Delhi and move to the home of the reigning champions, U Mumba at National Sports Club of India, Mumbai. The playoffs will return to the national capital for the semi-finals, playoffs and the finals.

Star Sports Pro Kabaddi is the only domestic Indian sports league to witness a strong rise in viewership as compared to its inaugural season. The rise in viewership in the second season validates the viewers’ progression from initial curiosity of season 1 to a deeper level of affinity and engagement with the aspirational avatar of Indian sport of Kabaddi.

The appeal of the league continues to deliver strongly with core urban youth audiences passionately following the game. The metro contribution in the first two weeks of Season 2 was 65% to overall television viewership demonstrating that the urban, millennial audiences have a strong affinity for the sport. The League has not only seen the viewership grow on TV but has also made a big impact digitally. The online viewership of Season 2 increased nearly 20 times already and over 13 million unique visitors to date. It has also been among the most talked about events on social media and has generated 5.73 billion potential impressions globally across 310,000 conversations so far.

Franchises

Stadium and locations

Points Table

League stage

Leg 1: Rajiv Gandhi Indoor Stadium, Vizag

Leg 2: Sree Kanteerava Stadium, Bengaluru

Leg 3: Netaji Indoor Stadium, Kolkata

Leg 4: Shree Shiv Chhatrapati Sports Complex, Pune

Leg 5: Patliputra Sports Complex, Patna

Leg 6: Sawai Mansingh Stadium, Jaipur

Leg 7: Thyagaraj Sports Complex, Delhi

Leg 8: Sardar Vallabhbhai Patel Indoor Stadium, Mumbai

Playoff Stage
All matches played at Indira Gandhi Indoor Stadium, New Delhi.

Semi-final

1st semi final

2nd semi final

Third Place

Final

Statistics

Top 5 Raiders

Top 5 Defenders

Team Statistics 

Source :

Final Cash Awards

References

External links 
 Download Le Panga song of Amitabh Bachchan for Pro kabaddi 2016

Pro Kabaddi League seasons
2016 in Indian sport